The 4 arrondissements of the Yvelines department are:
 Arrondissement of Mantes-la-Jolie, (subprefecture: Mantes-la-Jolie) with 109 communes. The population of the arrondissement was 271,436 in 2016.  
 Arrondissement of Rambouillet, (subprefecture: Rambouillet) with 83 communes.  The population of the arrondissement was 228,196 in 2016.  
 Arrondissement of Saint-Germain-en-Laye, (subprefecture: Saint-Germain-en-Laye) with 44 communes. The population of the arrondissement was 518,220 in 2016.  
 Arrondissement of Versailles, (prefecture of the Yvelines department: Versailles) with 23 communes. The population of the arrondissement was 413,956 in 2016.

History

In 1800 the arrondissements of Versailles and Mantes were established as part of the department Seine-et-Oise. The arrondissement of Rambouillet was created in 1812. The arrondissement of Mantes was disbanded in 1926, and restored in 1943. The arrondissement of Saint-Germain-en-Laye was created in 1962. In 1968 the department Seine-et-Oise was disbanded, and the arrondissements of Versailles, Mantes-la-Jolie, Rambouillet and Saint-Germain-en-Laye became part of the new department Yvelines. 

The borders of the arrondissements of Yvelines were modified in January 2017:
 one commune from the arrondissement of Mantes-la-Jolie to the arrondissement of Rambouillet
 six communes from the arrondissement of Mantes-la-Jolie to the arrondissement of Saint-Germain-en-Laye
 six communes from the arrondissement of Saint-Germain-en-Laye to the arrondissement of Versailles
 one commune from the arrondissement of Versailles to the arrondissement of Rambouillet

References

Yvelines